Mshamshono, pronounced Shamshono, is a rank of deacons in the Syriac Orthodox Church. The word mshamshono means Deacon.

Syriac Orthodox Church